Sidi Bennour (Berber: ⵙⵉⴷⵉ ⴱⵏⵏⵓⵕ, Arabic: سيدي بنور) is a city in Sidi Bennour Province, Casablanca-Settat, Morocco. Historically speaking, the name derives from the name of a famous sufi saint called Abi Yannur (Arabic: أبي يَنّور); "Sidi" is a common Arabic title attributed to a male Muslim who is a descendant of the Islamic prophet, Muhammad and/or is pious. His full name was Abi Yannur Abdullah Bin Wakris, a Moroccan Berber who lived in the 12th century . He is renowned for being one of the teachers of Abu Ayyub Assariyah _ a famous Moroccan sufi _ whose mausoleum is located in the city of Azemmour. The little information about his life can be found in books about Moroccan sufism such as (Unsu Al Faqir) by Ibn Al Khatib and (Attashawuf Ila Rijal Attasawuf) by Ibn Azayyat. According to the 2004 census, Sidi Bennour has a population of 39,593; however, since becoming the municipality of the newly formed Sidi Bennour province in 2011, the population has significantly increased.

Every Tuesday, the biggest livestock market of Morocco takes place in Sidi Bennour.

Economy 

The city has the biggest sugar factory of Morocco.

References

Former Portuguese colonies
World Heritage Sites in Morocco
Kingdom of the Algarve
Archaeological sites in Morocco
Populated places in Sidi Bennour Province
Municipalities of Morocco
1502 establishments in the Portuguese Empire
1769 disestablishments in the Portuguese Empire
1769 establishments in Morocco
Provincial capitals in Morocco
Phoenician colonies in Morocco